Brazilian Top Team (BTT) is an academy and team specialized in Brazilian Jiu Jitsu and mixed martial arts. It was established in April 2000 by Murilo Bustamante, Ricardo Libório, Mário Sperry and Luis Roberto Duarte, former members of the Carlson Gracie Academy, to develop and create new training techniques for Brazilian Jiu Jitsu, submission grappling and mixed martial arts.

History 
Brazilian Top Team has its origins with Carlson Gracie and his academy. Gracie was an innovator in Brazilian jiu-jitsu, he and his students had invented and refined many techniques and strategies in BJJ and fought in a very aggressive and physical style, achieving a lot of success in tournaments. His academy was also a Mixed martial arts pioneer, one of the first academies to create a specialized MMA program and many of his students went to represent BJJ in many MMA events around the world. However, there were disputes between Gracie and his students led to many branching off from his tutelage and founding their own academies. Murilo Bustamante, Ricardo Libório, Mário Sperry and Luis Roberto Duarte went to found in 2000 Brazilian Top Team, with the objective of creating a world-class Brazilian jiu-jitsu gym and to train in the nascent sport of Mixed martial arts.

Around that era, BTT have produced some of the best Brazilian MMA fighters of all time. The team was compared to the Real Madrid soccer team around 2003 because of the number of good fighters the team had.

In 2007 the Nogueira Brothers (Antônio Rodrigo Nogueira and Antônio Rogério Nogueira) founded their own team taking some BTT fighters with them. It split the power of the team at this time but BTT kept building young fighters. Ricardo Arona and Paulo Filho followed their own way but returned often to visit and train with the team at the BTT headquarters in Rio de Janeiro.

Ricardo Liborio left the team in 2002, moving to the US to found American Top Team (ATT) with American entrepreneur Dan Lambert and his fellow BTT and Carlson Gracie black belts Marcus "Conan" Silveira and Marcelo Silveira. While they share similar names and founders, ATT was not created as an American branch of BTT but as its own independent camp. ATT went to become one of the most successful MMA camps in the world. In any case, Bustamante and Liborio kept their friendship since the beginning of the times in Carlson Gracie school until now.

The team is growing with affiliates in Brazil, Canada, United States, Austria, Estonia, Australia and Thailand. One of the biggest Muay Thai camps in Thailand, Tiger Muay Thai, is affiliated with BTT to represent the team in Asia. It enables BTT fighters to learn Muay Thai from the roots of Thailand, and Thai fighters learn the BJJ and MMA from one of the best teams of all time.

Rivalry with Chute Boxe 

BTT maintains an intense rivalry with Brazilian mixed martial arts stable Chute Boxe, which is descended from a Muay Thai lineage. BTT traces its lineage to the Brazilian Jiu Jitsu of Carlson Gracie. The most storied chapter of this rivalry was reached at the apex of each team's success in PRIDE FC. Chute Boxe was comprised, at the time, of such fighters as Wanderlei Silva and Shogun Rua, and former UFC Middleweight Champion Anderson Silva.

BTT consisted of top fighters such as Ricardo Arona, former UFC Middleweight Championship holder Murilo Bustamante, the Nogueira Brothers, Vitor Belfort, Allan Goes, Mario Sperry, and former WEC Middleweight Champion Paulo Filho. Competition between the two teams was not limited to Pride FC matches. Bouts between fighters of the two camps took place in Brazil, Portugal, the U.S., and other parts of the world on a regular basis.

Locations 
In April 2000 BTT inaugurated a new center in Brazil for training professional fighters in mixed martial arts. It provides teachers of Muay Thai, boxing, wrestling, mixed martial arts and Brazilian Jiu-Jitsu.

Other locations are:
 Montreal, Quebec, Canada – Fábio Holanda opened Brazilian Top Team Canada and has trained prominent UFC Fighters Patrick Côté and UFC Welterweight Champion Georges St-Pierre.
 Long Beach, California – Marcelo Perdomo (BJJ Black Belt under BTT co-founder Murilo Bustamante) opened Brazilian Top Team Long Beach in mid-2004.
 Tustin, California – Total MMA Studios, Juliano Prado and Adriano Nasal.
 Boston, Massachusetts – In 2003 João C. Amaral and Daniel Gazoni opened Brazilian Top Team Boston, the first recognized BTT dojo in the United States. In 2021, Daniel Gazoni and Levi Moura opened a second location in Back Bay called Brazilian Top Team Back Bay
 Boca Raton, Florida – João C. Amaral
 West Palm Beach, Florida – João C. Amaral
 Melbourne, Florida – Edgard Dutra (BJJ black belt), BTT Florida
 Cocoa Beach, Florida – satellite school in cooperation with Force Fitness Gym
 San Antonio, Texas – Diego Gamonal Nogueira (BJJ black belt), BTT Texas
 Happy Valley, Oregon – Gustavo Bessa (BJJ black belt and Professional MMA Fighter),BTT Happy Valley
 Phuket, Thailand – Tiger Muay Thai, Fernando Maccachero (BJJ black belt)
 Austin, Texas – BTT Austin
 Charlotte, North Carolina-BTT Charlotte
 Richardson, Texas – BTT North Dallas, Leonardo Machado
 Tallinn, Estonia – BTT Estonia, Sergio De Andrade Cabral
 Jacksonville, Florida – Marcello Salazar
 Humble, Texas- Darren McCall, 3rd Degree Black Belt
 Hamilton, Bermuda- Marcos Tulio, 3rd Degree Black Belt
 Lake Jackson, Texas – Fernando Halfeld
 Cambridge, UK – Leonardo Gamarra, 4th Degree Black Belt
 Evergreen, CO – David Roberts, 1st Degree Black Belt
 Fullerton, CA – Jaysen Jose Baxter, 3rd Degree Black Belt
 Vienna, Austria – Fernando Paulon, 5th Degree Black Belt

Notable MMA fighters 
 Vitor Belfort – former UFC Light-Heavyweight Champion; former competitor for UFC; former competitor for PRIDE FC; former competitor for Affliction
 David Bielkheden – former competitor for UFC
 Murilo Bustamante – former UFC middleweight champion, and PRIDE FC Welterweight Grand Prix finalist; former competitor for UFC and PRIDE FC
 Patrick Côté – competitor for UFC
 Paulo Filho – former competitor for PRIDE FC; former WEC Middleweight Champion; current competitor for DREAM
 Allan Goes – former competitor for PRIDE FC; former competitor for UFC; former competitor for IFL
 Ikuhisa Minowa – former competitor for PRIDE FC; DREAM Super Hulk (Open-Weight) Grand Prix champion
 Antônio Rodrigo Nogueira – former PRIDE FC Heavyweight Champion; former Interim Heavyweight Champion for UFC
 Antônio Rogério Nogueira – former competitor for PRIDE FC; former competitor for Affliction
 Rousimar Palhares – former WSOF Welterweight Champion
 Fernando Paulon – former competitor Cage Fight Live
 Marcello Salazar – former competitor for IFL
 Antônio Silva – former Heavyweight Champion for Elite XC; competitor for UFC; former competitor for Strikeforce
 Mario Sperry – former competitor for PRIDE FC
 Milton Vieira – competitor for UFC
 Ricardo Arona – competitor for Pride
Henrique "Chocolate" Nogueira – competitor for Cage Rage ans Cage Warriors
Celso Rolim Junior – former competitor for TFC, MFC and XFG

See also 
 List of Top Professional MMA Training Camps

References

External links 
 Bustamante speaks about BTT's new horizons
 BTT on the GymDB

2006 establishments in Brazil
Brazilian jiu-jitsu organizations
Mixed martial arts training facilities
Brazilian jiu-jitsu training facilities